The Isaka–Kigali Standard Gauge Railway is a planned railway line linking the town of Isaka in Tanzania to the city of Kigali in Rwanda.

Location
The railway line would start at the inland container depot (ICD) at Isaka, in the Kahama Rural District of Shinyanga Region, in Tanzania. The line would travel in a general northwesterly direction to the border town of Rusumo, Rwanda, in Kirehe District in the Eastern Province of Rwanda. From here the line would continue westward, through Rwanda, to end at Kigali, the capital and largest city of the country.

Overview
This 1435 mm (4 ft  in) railway line is intended to ease the transfer of goods between the port of Dar es Salaam and the city of Kigali, and subsequently to Bujumbura in Burundi and to Goma in the Democratic Republic of the Congo. Goods would either travel to Isaka from Dar es Salaam on the existing narrow-gauge railway line, or on the Dar es Salaam–Mwanza Standard Gauge Railway when completed. After offloading at the existing internal container depot (ICD) at Isaka, the goods would be loaded on this standard gauge railway line for transport to Kigali. The line is part of wider East African Railway Master Plan.

Construction
The construction, is expected to be financed jointly by the governments of Tanzania and Rwanda. As of January 2018, the feasibility studies for this project have been concluded.

Construction is expected to start in October 2018 at an estimated total cost of US$2.5 billion. Burundi has put its standard gauge railway project on hold.

In March 2018, The EastAfrican reported that both countries had agreed to change the railway design to accommodate electric locomotives which are faster than the original diesel-powered equipment. In April 2018, the same newspaper further reported that the World Bank had expressed its willingness to fund this project.

In Rwanda
Rwanda has plans to extend the SGR to Bugesera International Airport.

In December 2018, the New Times newspaper reported that the budgeted cost for the Rwanda section had increased to US$1.3 billion.

In Tanzania
The standard gauge railway from Dar es Salaam to Mwanza is being built in sections. The Dar es Salaam to Morogoro section is under construction. In September 2017, a firm from Turkey was awarded a second contract worth US$1.92 billion to construct the line between Morogoro and Makutupora. The government of Tanzania has advertised for designing and building services for the Makutupora-Tabora-Isaka-Mwanza sections of the railway line. In July 2018, the Trade and Development Bank pledged to lend US$200 million towards the establishment of the "Central Tanzania Standard Gauge Railway Line".

See also
 Standard-gauge railway
 Uganda Standard Gauge Railway
 Rwanda Standard Gauge Railway
 East African Railway Master Plan

References

External links
Rwanda Bypasses Uganda For Its Own Standard Gauge Railway Line 

Standard gauge railways in Tanzania
Standard gauge railways in Rwanda
International railway lines
Railway lines in Tanzania
Railway lines in Rwanda
Government-owned companies of Tanzania
Government-owned companies of Rwanda